Mohammed Hamada (Arabic: محمد حمادة; born 14 March 2002) is a Palestinian weightlifter from Gaza. He is the first Palestinian to compete in the sport at the Olympics.

The weightlifter is slated to participate in the men's 96-kilogram event at the 2020 Tokyo Olympics.

Hamada left Gaza several weeks before the Olympics to avoid travelling issues, having secured his place after participating in six international qualifying contests since 2019. His brother Hussam is the Palestinian national weightlifting team coach.

References

External links 
 

Living people
2002 births
Palestinian male weightlifters
Olympic weightlifters of Palestine
Weightlifters at the 2020 Summer Olympics
People from Gaza City
21st-century Palestinian people